Inverse resolution is an inductive reasoning technique that involves inverting the resolution operator.

References

Inductive reasoning